On the American Spokane, Portland and Seattle Railway, locomotive number 525 was the only steam locomotive in SP&S class O-2.  It was originally built for Northern Pacific by the Schenectady Locomotive Works.  Builders number 46878 was built in February 1910.

Background
In the early 1920s the SP&S had experienced an increase in traffic, especially logging traffic off the Portland, Astoria and Pacific and United Railways west of Portland, Oregon.  To help handle this tonnage, several locomotives were leased from the Great Northern Railway and Northern Pacific Railway.  To offset these costs, several of these locomotives were sold by the parent roads to the SP&S.  Number 525 was one of these locomotives.

Operational history
Number 525 was officially bought by the SP&S on November 30, 1925.  It was used on the mainline because it was able to haul heavier eastbound trains upgrade out of Pasco, Washington.  Over time, as newer locomotives were obtained by the SP&S, number 525 was demoted to local or work service, or used on doubleheaded mainline trains.  By late 1942 and early 1943, 525 was assigned to the Vancouver, Washington, yard as a switch locomotive.  Number 525 was finally scrapped in 1947.

Numbering
SP&S number 525 was originally NP number 1698, in class W-1.

Disposition
SP&S Number 525 was dismantled on October 31, 1947.

References 

Steam locomotives of the United States
O-2
ALCO locomotives
2-8-2 locomotives
Scrapped locomotives
Freight locomotives
Standard gauge locomotives of the United States